The Mediterranean Corridor is number 3 of the nine priority axes of the Trans-European Transport Network (TEN-T).

Rail
The Mediterranean Corridor crosses six EU countries (Spain, France, Italy, Slovenia, Croatia and Hungary), over more than 6.000 km along the route: Almeria-Valencia/Madrid-Zaragoza/Barcelona-Marseille-Lyon-Turin-Milan-Verona-Padua/Venice-Trieste/Koper-Ljubljana-Budapest-Záhony.

Main branches
The five main branches of the Mediterranean Corridor are:

 Algeciras-Bobadilla-Madrid-Zaragoza-Tarragona
 Seville-Bobadilla-Murcia
 Cartagena-Murcia-Valencia-Tarragona
 Tarragona-Barcelona-Perpignan-Marseille/Lyon-Turin-Novara-Milan-Verona-Padua-Venice-Ravenna/Trieste/Koper-Ljubljana-Budapest
 Ljubljana/Rijeka-Zagreb-Budapest

References

External links
 Trans-European Transport Network (TEN-T) at European Union official web site
 Mediterranean Corridor at European Union official web site

Transport and the European Union
TEN-T Core Network Corridors